The elepaios are three species of monarch flycatcher in the genus Chasiempis. They are endemic to the Hawaiian Islands, and were formerly considered conspecific. They measure 14 cm long and weigh 12–18 g. One species inhabits the Big Island, another Oahu and the third Kauai. Being one of the most adaptable native birds of Hawaii, no subspecies have yet become extinct, though two have become quite rare.

The elepaio is the first native bird to sing in the morning and the last to stop singing at night; apart from whistled and chattering contact and alarm calls, it is probably best known for its song, from which derives the common name: a pleasant and rather loud warble which sounds like e-le-PAI-o or ele-PAI-o. It nests between January and June.

Taxonomy and systematics
The genus Chasiempis contains three species:

Distribution

Uniquely among Hawaiian passerines, the distribution of the elepaio is peculiarly discontinuous. According to fossil remains, the birds did not occur on Maui Nui or its successor islands. Their current distribution is absent from the Maui Nui island group. If this assumption is correct, the reasons are unknown at present. However, the strange "flycatcher finches", extinct honeycreepers of the genus Vangulifer, are only known to have inhabited Maui and probably evolved on Maui Nui. There, they probably filled the same ecological niche as the elepaio did on the other islands. Competition from Vangulifer may thus have prevented a successful colonization of Maui Nui by Chasiempis.

Cultural significance
In Hawaiian tradition, the elepaio was among the most celebrated of the birds. It is associated with a number of significant roles in culture and mythology. Chiefly, it helped kālai waa (canoe-builders) to select the right koa tree to use for their waa (canoe). The elepaio is a bold and curious little bird, and thus it was attracted to humans whom it found working in its habitat, and it quickly learned to exploit feeding opportunities created by human activity, altering its behavior accordingly – which incidentally made it even more conspicuous.

For example, it followed canoe builders through dense vegetation, watching them as they searched for suitable trees. They considered it their guardian spirit, an incarnation of their patron goddess Lea, because if the bird pecked at a fallen tree, it was a sign that the tree was riddled with burrowing insects and thus not good anymore, but when the bird showed no interest in a tree, it indicated that the wood was suitable. This is the origin of the ancient Hawaiian proverb, Uā elepaio ia ka waa ("The canoe is marked out by the elepaio"). Due to its insectivorous habit, farmers believed the elepaio to be the incarnation of Lea's sister goddess, Hina-puku-ai, who protected food plants and was a patron of agriculture.

Status
Although deforestation for agriculture destroyed large areas of habitat, the elepaio managed to adapt well to the initial settlement. Thus, its population was large enough to withstand the additional pressures that came about with Western colonization of the islands. However, the Oahu species has declined precipitously in recent years and is now endangered.

References

Further reading
 
Elepaio on the Audubon watch list. Contains a photo of sclateri, which shows the distinctness of that taxon well.
Elepaios - BirdLife International

Hawaiiana
Hawaiian mythology
Monarchidae
Endemic birds of Hawaii
Taxa named by Jean Cabanis